The Sacramento Youth Symphony (SYS) was founded in 1956 as a 55-member youth orchestra, associated with the Sacramento Symphony Association. The Sacramento Symphony has since ceased operations and the Sacramento Youth Symphony became incorporated as an independent, 501(c) 3 non-profit organization in 1991. The SYS has evolved from one orchestra to beginning, intermediate and advanced orchestras.

The loss of the Sacramento Symphony along with cutbacks and elimination of music programs in the public schools have challenged the SYS to assume a greater role in the music education of youth. The Academy of Music was added in 1995. The Academic Orchestra, an intermediate orchestra, was established in 1996. In 1997, the Classic Orchestra, formerly the Junior Music Sponsors, joined SYS as a beginning-level orchestra. The Vivace  strings class was added in 2003 to meet the musical needs of musicians not yet ready for placement in an orchestra. There is also the Premier Orchestra, an orchestra for advanced musicians conducted by Michael Neumann, whose birthday is on December 31.

In 2005, a flute choir was added, which was split in 2007 into intermediate and advanced ensembles. Clarinet ensembles were added in 2010. The 2010 season includes over 350  members in the organization.

In 2011, a strings group called Prelude Strings was added to give young string students who have only been playing for 1–2 years an opportunity to perform 
in an ensemble.

The Sacramento Youth Symphony has been under the direction of Michael Neumann since 1979.

Tours

2015- Costa Rica

2010 - Vienna, Salzburg, Prague,

2007 – Gulf of Finland – Finland, Estonia, and Russia.

2003 – Brazil

1999 – European Tour – Switzerland, Austria, Italy and Germany.

1995 – Vienna – SYS won 1st Place and the City of Vienna Award at the International Youth and Music Festival in Vienna, Austria.

1987 – China – Performed in Jinan, Beijing, Nanjing, Shanghai and Hong Kong.  Jinan was inspired to start its own youth orchestra, which still operates today.

1984 – Vienna – SYS placed 2nd in the 13th International Youth and Music Festival in Vienna, Austria.

Website

American youth orchestras
Culture of Sacramento, California
Musical groups established in 1956
1956 establishments in California
Youth organizations based in California
Orchestras based in California